Vistino is a rural locality (a village) in Kingiseppsky District of Leningrad Oblast, Russia. Population: 991 (2007 est.).

The village has a museum dedicated to the Izhorian heritage of the region.

The Ust-Luga Multimodal Complex, an industrial zone, is planned to be built around Vistino.

References

External links

Official website of Vistinskoye Rural Settlement 

Rural localities in Leningrad Oblast